Marion Cotillard (born 30 September 1975) is a French actress. Known for her roles in independent films and blockbusters in both European and Hollywood productions, she has received various accolades, including an Academy Award, a British Academy Film Award, a Golden Globe Award, a European Film Award, a Lumières Award and two César Awards. She became a Knight of the Order of Arts and Letters in France in 2010, and was promoted to Officer in 2016. She has served as a spokeswoman for Greenpeace since 2001.

Cotillard had her first English-language role in the TV series Highlander (1993), and made her film debut in The Story of a Boy Who Wanted to Be Kissed (1994). Her breakthrough came in the successful French film Taxi (1998), which earned her a César Award nomination for Most Promising Actress. She made the transition into Hollywood in Tim Burton's Big Fish (2003), and won her first César Award for Best Supporting Actress for her performance in A Very Long Engagement (2004). She had her major English-language role up to that point in A Good Year (2006).

For her portrayal of French singer Édith Piaf in La Vie en Rose (2007), Cotillard won her second César Award, a BAFTA Award, a Golden Globe Award, a Lumières Award and the Academy Award for Best Actress, becoming the first and (as of 2023) only actor to win an Academy Award for a French-language performance, and also the second actress to have won this award for a non-English language performance. Her performances in Nine (2009), Rust and Bone (2012), and Annette (2021) earned Cotillard three more Golden Globe nominations. For Two Days, One Night (2014), she received a second Academy Award nomination for Best Actress, her second nomination for a French-language film. Cotillard is one of only seven actors to receive multiple Academy Award nominations for non-English language performances. She has continued to star in major English-language films such as Public Enemies (2009), Inception (2010), Contagion (2011), Midnight in Paris (2011), The Dark Knight Rises (2012), The Immigrant (2013), Macbeth (2015), and Allied (2016).

Cotillard has played Joan of Arc on stage in several countries between 2005 and 2022 in the oratorio Joan of Arc at the Stake. She provided voice acting for the animated films The Little Prince (2015), April and the Extraordinary World (2015), the French version of Minions (2015), and Charlotte (2021). Her other notable French, Belgian and Canadian films include La Belle Verte (1996), Pretty Things (2001), Love Me If You Dare (2003), Dikkenek (2006), Little White Lies (2010), and It's Only the End of the World (2016). Cotillard was also the face of the Lady Dior handbag for nine years. Since 2020, she is the face of Chanel's fragrance Chanel No. 5.

Early life
Cotillard was born on 30 September 1975 in Paris and grew up around Orléans in an artistically inclined household. Her father, Jean-Claude Cotillard, is an actor, teacher, former mime, and theatre director, of Breton descent. Cotillard's mother, Monique Niseema Theillaud, is an actress and drama teacher    She has two younger twin brothers, Quentin and Guillaume. Cotillard's father introduced her to cinema, and as a child she would mimic Louise Brooks and Greta Garbo in her own bedroom. She began acting during her childhood, appearing in one of her father's plays.

At the age of 15, Cotillard entered the Conservatoire d'art dramatique in Orléans. She graduated in 1994 and then moved to Paris to pursue an acting career.

Acting career

Early work and transition to Hollywood (1993–2006)
After small appearances and performances in theatre, Cotillard had occasional, minor roles in television series such as Highlander—where she had her first English-speaking role aged 17. Her career as a film actress began in the mid-1990s, with minor roles in Philippe Harel's The Story of a Boy Who Wanted to Be Kissed (1994), which was her feature film debut at the age of 18, and in Arnaud Desplechin's My Sex Life... or How I Got into an Argument, and Coline Serreau's La Belle Verte (both 1996). Also in 1996, Cotillard had her first leading role in the television film Chloé, directed by Dennis Berry, with Cotillard starring as a teenage runaway who is forced into prostitution, opposite Anna Karina. In 1998, she appeared in Gérard Pirès' action comedy Taxi, playing Lilly Bertineau, the girlfriend of delivery boy Daniel, played by Samy Naceri. The film was a hit in France and Cotillard was nominated for a César Award for Most Promising Actress. She reprised the role in Taxi 2 (2000) and Taxi 3 (2003).

Cotillard ventured into science fiction with Alexandre Aja's post-apocalyptic romantic drama, Furia, released in 1999, a year in which she also starred in the Swiss war drama War in the Highlands (La Guerre dans le Haut Pays), for which she won the Best Actress Award at the Autrans Film Festival in 1999. In 2001, she appeared in Pierre Grimblat's film Lisa, playing the title role and younger version of Jeanne Moreau's character, alongside Benoît Magimel and Sagamore Stévenin. She also starred in Gilles Paquet-Brenner's film Pretty Things (Les Jolies Choses), adapted from the work of feminist writer Virginie Despentes, portraying twins of completely opposite characters, Lucie and Marie; for that role, she was again nominated for a César Award for Most Promising Actress. In 2002, Cotillard starred in Guillaume Nicloux's thriller A Private Affair (Une Affaire Privée), in which she portrayed the mysterious Clarisse.

Cotillard started the transition into Hollywood when she obtained a supporting role in Tim Burton's 2003 film Big Fish playing Joséphine, the French wife of Billy Crudup's character, William Bloom. The production, her first English-language film, allowed her to work with well-established actors such as Helena Bonham Carter, Albert Finney, Ewan McGregor, Jessica Lange and Allison Lohman. Big Fish was a critical and commercial success. She also starred in the 2003 French romantic comedy film Love Me If You Dare (Jeux d'enfants), as Sophie Kowalsky, the daughter of Polish immigrants. The film was directed by Yann Samuel and was a box office hit in France with over 1 million tickets sold.

In 2004, she won the Chopard Trophy of Female Revelation at the Cannes Film Festival, and appeared in Jean-Pierre Jeunet's A Very Long Engagement (Un Long Dimanche de Fiançailles), as the vengeful Tina Lombardi, for which she won a César Award for Best Supporting Actress, and the mystery thriller Innocence, as Mademoiselle Éva; both films were acclaimed by critics. In 2005, Cotillard starred in six films: Steve Suissa's Cavalcade, Abel Ferrara's Mary, Richard Berry's The Black Box (La Boîte Noire); Love Is in the Air (Ma vie en l'air), Burnt Out (Sauf le respect que je vous dois), and Stéphan Guérin-Tillié's Edy.

In May 2005, Cotillard portrayed Joan of Arc for the first time in the Orléans Symphonic Orchestra's production of Arthur Honegger's oratorio Joan of Arc at the Stake at the Palais des Sports d'Orléans, in Orléans, France. She reprised the role several times when performing the oratorio in different countries in the following years.

In 2006, the actress took on significant roles in four feature films, including Ridley Scott's romantic dramedy A Good Year, in which she portrayed Fanny Chenal, a French café owner in a small Provençal town, opposite Russell Crowe as a Londoner who inherits a local property. She played Nadine in the Belgian comedy Dikkenek, alongside Mélanie Laurent, and the role of Nicole in Fair Play. She also played Léna in the satirical coming-of-age film Toi et moi, directed by Julie Lopes-Curval, for which she learned how to play the cello for her role.

La Vie en Rose and worldwide recognition (2007–2010)

Cotillard was chosen by director Olivier Dahan to star as French singer Édith Piaf in his biographical film La Vie en Rose before he had even met the actress, saying that he noticed a similarity between Piaf's and Cotillard's eyes. It was dubbed "the most awaited film of 2007" in France, where some critics said Cotillard had reincarnated Édith Piaf to sing one last time on stage. At the film's premiere at the Berlin International Film Festival, Cotillard was in attendance and given a 15-minute standing ovation. Hollywood talent agent Hylda Queally signed Cotillard shortly after the premiere at the festival. La Vie en Rose was a box office hit in France, with more than 5 million admissions, and made US$86 million worldwide on a US$25 million budget.

Cotillard became the first actress to win a Golden Globe for a non-English language performance since 1972 (when Liv Ullmann won for The Emigrants) and also the first person ever to win a  Golden Globe for a (Comedy or Musical) non-English language performance. On 10 February 2008, Cotillard became the first French actress since Stéphane Audran in 1973 to be awarded the BAFTA Award for Best Actress in a Leading Role. At the Academy Awards, she won Best Actress, becoming the first woman and second person (after Adrien Brody in The Pianist six years earlier) to win both a César and an Oscar for the same performance. Cotillard is the second French actress to win this award and the third overall to win an Oscar, after Simone Signoret in 1960 and Juliette Binoche in 1997. She is the first Best Actress Oscar winner for a non-English language performance since Sophia Loren in 1961. She is also the first and (as of 2023) only winner of an Academy Award for a French-language performance. Following her win, Cotillard was one of 105 individuals invited to join the Academy of Motion Picture Arts and Sciences on 24 June 2008.

Cotillard starred alongside Johnny Depp and Christian Bale in the role of Billie Frechette in Michael Mann's Public Enemies, released in the United States on 1 July  2009. Later that year, she appeared in director Rob Marshall's film adaptation of Nine, the musical based on the Federico Fellini film . As Luisa Contini, the wife of Guido (Daniel Day-Lewis), Cotillard performed two musical numbers: "My Husband Makes Movies" and "Take It All." Time magazine ranked her performance in Nine as the fifth best female performance of 2009, behind Mo'Nique, Carey Mulligan, Saoirse Ronan and Meryl Streep. She won the Desert Palm Achievement Actress Award at the 2010 Palm Springs International Film Festival – her second prize from the festival – and was nominated for a Golden Globe for Best Actress in a Motion Picture – Musical or Comedy for her work in Nine. Cotillard appeared on the cover of the November 2009 issue of Vogue with her Nine co-stars, and on the magazine's July 2010 cover by herself.

Cotillard was the Honorary President of the 35th César Awards ceremony, held 27 February 2010. She played Mal Cobb, a projection of Dom Cobb (Leonardo DiCaprio)'s deceased wife, in Christopher Nolan's film Inception, released on 16 July 2010. Nolan described Mal as "the essence of the femme fatale", and DiCaprio praised Cotillard, saying "she can be strong and vulnerable and hopeful and heartbreaking all in the same moment, which was perfect for all the contradictions of her character." The film made US$825 million in worldwide box-office receipts, and Cotillard and DiCaprio's pairing in Inception ranked eighth on the Forbes list of "Hollywood's Top Earning On-Screen Couples." Cotillard also starred in Guillaume Canet's drama Little White Lies (Les petits mouchoirs) as Marie, an environmentalist.

Established actress and continued acclaim (2011–2015)
In 2011, Cotillard costarred in Woody Allen's Midnight in Paris as Pablo Picasso's fictionalized mistress Adriana, with whom Owen Wilson's character, Gil, falls in love. The film grossed $151 million worldwide on a $17 million budget. She also appeared in 2011 with Kate Winslet, Jude Law, Gwyneth Paltrow and Matt Damon in Steven Soderbergh's thriller Contagion; and had the top rank on Le Figaros 2011 list of the highest-paid French actors in 2010, the first time in nine years that a female had topped the list. She also tied with Kate Winslet as the highest-paid foreign actress in Hollywood.
In 2012, Cotillard was ranked ninth on the list of the highest-paid French actresses in 2011, and portrayed Miranda Tate (alongside her Public Enemies co-star Christian Bale) in Christopher Nolan's Batman feature The Dark Knight Rises.

Cotillard next portrayed an orca trainer who loses her legs after a work accident in Jacques Audiard's drama Rust and Bone (De rouille et d'os), costarring Matthias Schoenaerts. The film premiered in the main competition at the 2012 Cannes Film Festival and received a 10-minute standing ovation at its screening. Cotillard received rave reviews for her performance, and Cate Blanchett wrote an op-ed for Variety describing the film as "simply astonishing" and stating that "Marion has created a character of nobility and candour, seamlessly melding herself into a world we could not have known without her. Her performance is as unexpected and as unsentimental and raw as the film itself." She earned a fifth César Award nomination, a fourth Screen Actors Guild Award nomination, a third Golden Globe nomination (her first for Best Actress – Drama), and her second Critics' Choice Award and Lumières Award nominations. Cotillard also received several other honors and career tributes in 2012, at the Telluride Film Festival, Hollywood Film Festival, AFI Fest, Gotham Awards and Harper's Bazaar Awards.

In 2013, Cotillard was named Woman of the Year by Harvard's student society Hasty Pudding Theatricals, and Le Figaroalso ranked her the second highest-paid actress in France in 2012 and the seventh highest-paid actor overall. In May 2013, she appeared with Gary Oldman, her co-star in The Dark Knight Rises, in the controversial music video for "The Next Day" by David Bowie.

Cotillard had her first leading role in an American movie in James Gray's The Immigrant as Polish-born Ewa Cybulska, who emigrates hoping to experience the American dream in 1920s New York. James Gray wrote the script especially for Cotillard after meeting her at a French restaurant with her boyfriend. Cotillard had to learn 20 pages of Polish dialogue for her role, and Gray stated that she is the best actor he's ever worked with. Her performance was widely acclaimed, and she was awarded the New York Film Critics Circle Award, the National Society of Film Critics Award, the Toronto Film Critics Association Award and was nominated for an Independent Spirit Award for Best Actress in 2015. She starred in Guillaume Canet's Blood Ties in 2013 with Clive Owen, Billy Crudup and her Rust and Bone co-star Matthias Schoenaerts; and had a cameo in Anchorman 2: The Legend Continues, acting opposite Jim Carrey in the battle scene between rival news teams. In December 2013, Cotillard was a member of the 13th Marrakech Film Festival jury presided by Martin Scorsese.

In 2014, she starred in Two Days, One Night (Deux jours, une nuit), as Sandra, a Belgian factory worker who has just one weekend to convince her co-workers to give up their bonuses so that she can keep her job. The film premiered in the main competition at the 2014 Cannes Film Festival and earned a 15-minute standing ovation, with Cotillard's performance praised as "a career-high performance" and "the best performance of the festival." Cotillard was favored to win the festival's Best Actress prize, which ended up going to Julianne Moore for Maps to the Stars. Several critics' awards followed, as well as a European Film Award for Best Actress, a second Academy Award nomination, and a sixth César Award. Her performances in both The Immigrant and Two Days, One Night shared the fourth spot on Times list of Best Movie Performances of 2014. In November 2014, Cotillard participated on Comedy Central's All-Star Non-Denominational Christmas Special, in a duet with Nathan Fielder on the Elvis Presley song "Can't Help Falling in Love".

In 2015, Cotillard took on the role of Lady Macbeth in a film adaption of William Shakespeare's play, directed by Justin Kurzel and starring Michael Fassbender in the title role. The film premiered at the Cannes Film Festival and Cotillard's performance earned her a British Independent Film Award for Best Actress nomination, and high praise from critics, particularly for her "Out, Damned Spot" monologue. Variety critic Guy Lodge remarked: "Her deathless sleepwalking scene, staged in minimalist fashion under a gauze of snowflakes in a bare chapel, is played with tender, desolate exhaustion; it deserves to be viewed as near-definitive."

That same year, Cotillard starred in New York Philharmonic's production of Arthur Honegger's oratorio Joan of Arc at the Stake, and voiced the roles of The Rose in both the English and French versions of The Little Prince, directed by Mark Osborne; Scarlet Overkill in the French version of Minions; and April in the French-Canadian-Belgian 3D animated film April and the Extraordinary World (Avril et le Monde Truqué).

Return to French cinema (2016–present)
In 2016, Cotillard played Gabrielle, a free-spirited woman in a convenience marriage, in Nicole Garcia's From the Land of the Moon (Mal de Pierres), an adaptation of the bestselling Italian novel Mal di Pietre by Milena Agus, which marked her return to French cinema after 2012's Rust and Bone, and earned her a seventh César Award nomination. She also played the role of Catherine, the sister-in-law of a gay playwright (portrayed by Gaspard Ulliel), who returns home to tell his family that he is dying in Xavier Dolan's Canadian-French co-production It's Only the End of the World (Juste la fin du Monde). Both films premiered in the main competition section of the 2016 Cannes Film Festival, to polarized reactions from critics. It's Only the End of the World was a box office hit in France with over 1 million tickets sold.

Cotillard starred opposite Brad Pitt in Allied (2016), a spy film set in World War II directed by Robert Zemeckis, in which she played Marianne Beausejour, a French Resistance fighter. While critical reviews were mixed, Stephanie Zacharek of Time magazine felt that "Pitt and Cotillard give sturdy, coded performances that feel naturalistic, not phony: They understand clearly that their chief mission is to tap the tradition of melodrama, and they take it seriously. Somehow, almost incomprehensibly, it all works. Allied looks old but smells new, and the scent is heady." The film grossed US$120 million worldwide. Cotillard reteamed with Macbeth director Justin Kurzel and co-star Michael Fassbender in the film adaptation of the video game Assassin's Creed, also released in 2016.

On 30 January 2017, Cotillard was honored with a special award for her career at the 22nd Lumières Awards in France. In 2017, she also starred in Guillaume Canet's satire comedy Rock'n Roll, and Arnaud Desplechin's drama Ismael's Ghosts (Les Fantomes d'Ismaël), alongside Mathieu Amalric, Charlotte Gainsbourg and Louis Garrel. The Hollywood Reporter, in its review for the former film, asserted that "Cotillard offers up such a sincere performance that you can't help but laugh".

In the 2018 drama Angel Face (Gueule d'ange) by director Vanessa Fialho, she portrayed Marlene, a woman who suddenly chooses to abandon her daughter for a man she has just met during yet another night of excess. The film premiered in the Un Certain Regard section at the Cannes Film Festival. In 2019, Cotillard reprised the role of Marie in Little White Lies 2, sequel to 2010's Little White Lies directed by Guillaume Canet.

In 2020, Cotillard voiced Tutu, the fox in the comedy film Dolittle by Stephen Gaghan. In 2021, she starred as Ann Defrasnoux alongside Adam Driver in the musical film Annette directed by Leos Carax. Her performance in Annette earned her a Golden Globe nomination for Best Actress in a Motion Picture – Musical or Comedy.

Cotillard produced the documentary Bigger Than Us, directed by Flore Vasseur, which explores the social movement of young people fighting for change in the 21st Century. The documentary was released in France on 22 September 2021 following its world premiere at the 2021 Cannes Film Festival, and it was nominated for a César Award for Best Documentary Film in 2022.

Cotillard voiced German artist Charlotte Salomon in the French version of the animated biographical film Charlotte, directed by Eric Warin and Tahir Rana, which follows the last 10 years of Salomon's life, a Jewish woman who struggled with depression amid World War II and the Holocaust while exiled in the South of France. Cotillard was also an executive producer on the film that made its world premiere at the Toronto International Film Festival in September 2021. In October 2021, Cotillard played Kim Randall in La Vengeance au Triple Galop, a comedy TV film for France's Canal Plus directed by Alex Lutz and Arthur Sanigou.

In April 2021, it was announced that Cotillard would make her third collaboration with director Arnaud Desplechin in the film Brother and Sister (Frère et Sœur), which follows two siblings, Alice and Louis, played by Cotillard and Melvil Poupaud, who are forced to reunite after the death of their parents following two decades of shared silence. The film premiered in the main competition at the 2022 Cannes Film Festival in May 2022.

During the 2022 Cannes Film Festival, Cotillard launched alongside filmmaker Cyril Dion and producer Magali Payen her new production company, Newtopia. The company's central aim is to create content around issues such as environmentalism, science, society, health, geopolitics, feminism and gender "that imagine a better future for the world based on ecologically sustainable and socially fair practices".

Cotillard voiced Coco Chanel in Rencontre(s), a 15-minute immersive virtual reality project directed by Mathias Chelebourg, which premiered at the 79th Venice Film Festival in September 2022.

Upcoming projects
In September 2020, Cotillard was announced to co-star with Joel Edgerton in The Brutalist, to be directed by Brady Corbet.

In October 2021, she was cast in the Apple TV+ climate-change anthology series Extrapolations, and was signed to portray French Vogue fashion director Solange D’Ayen in the World War II drama Lee, starring Kate Winslet as photographer Lee Miller. In late 2022, she shot Little Girl Blue, a docudrama by director Mona Achache in which Cotillard portrays Achache's mother. She also voiced Louise de Savoy in The Inventor, a 2023 stop-motion animated film about the life of Leonardo da Vinci, written and directed by Jim Capobianco.

Other endeavours

Music
Cotillard sings, plays guitar, bass guitar, keyboard and tambourine. She co-wrote and performed the song "La Fille De Joie" for her 2001 film Pretty Things (Les Jolies Choses), in which she played a singer and also performed the song "La Conne" for the film. Canadian singer Hawksley Workman, said in interviews about his album Between the Beautifuls that he worked and wrote songs with Cotillard while they both were in Los Angeles during the 2007–2008 movie awards season. In 2008, she co-wrote and performed the song "The Strong Ones" with Hawksley Workman for Olivier Dahan's short film for Cartier's Love range. In 2010, Cotillard recorded the songs "Five Thousand Nights" and "Happy Crowd" with the French Rock band Yodelice for their album "Cardioid". She also went on tour with the band in different cities in France and Belgium, under the pseudonym "Simone", which is her maternal grandmother's name. In the same year, she appeared in the video "More Than Meets the Eyes" from Yodelice.

Cotillard recorded the song "The Eyes of Mars" with Franz Ferdinand especially for Dior. In 2012, she wrote and performed the song "Lily's Body" for the fourth episode of the Lady Dior Web Documentary with the same title, and in 2014, Cotillard wrote and performed the song "Snapshot in LA" alongside John Cameron Mitchell, Metronomy's Joseph Mount and Villaine. She also wrote and co-directed the video for the song, made for Lady Dior's advertising campaign "Enter the Game – Dior Cruise 2015".

Singles
 2001: "L'homme d'amour" with Jeanne Moreau – soundtrack of the film Lisa
 2001: "La fille de joie" and La conne – soundtrack of the film Pretty Things
 2002: "Une affaire privée" – soundtrack of the film A Private Affair
 2005: "It Had to Be You" – soundtrack of the film Edy
 2008: "The Strong Ones" with Hawksley Workman for LOVE by Cartier campaign
 2009: "Beds Are Burning" for the project TckTckTck – Time for Climate Justice
 2009: "My Husband Makes Movies" and "Take It All" – soundtrack of the film Nine
 2010: "Five Thousand Nights" and "Happy Crowd" with Yodelice on the album Cardioid
 2010: "The Eyes of Mars" with Franz Ferdinand for Lady Dior campaign
 2012: "Lily's Body" for Lady Dior campaign
 2014: "Snapshot in LA" for Lady Dior campaign

Philanthropy
In addition to her film work, Cotillard is active in philanthropy, environmental activism, and has participated in campaigns for environmental protection, in particular Greenpeace, for whom she has been a member and acted as a spokesperson since 2001. Cotillard is the patron of Maud Fontenoy Foundation, a non-governmental organization which is dedicated to teaching children about preserving the oceans. She is also the ambassador of Association Wayanga, a French association that supports indigenous peoples for their rights and the preservation of their cultures and the Amazon Forest they inhabit. She supports The Heart Fund, an international public charity that is a pioneer in technological innovation to combat cardiovascular diseases in children, and is also a member of WWF and the Nicolas Hulot Foundation, which supports environmental initiatives in France and abroad to engage the ecological transition of our societies.

In 2005, she contributed to Dessins pour le climat ("Drawings for the Climate"), a book of drawings published by Greenpeace to raise funds for the group, and in 2010, she traveled to Congo with Greenpeace to visit tropical rainforests threatened by logging companies, it was shown in the documentary The Congolese Rainforests: Living on Borrowed Time. In 2009, Cotillard was one of many celebrities to record a cover version of the song Beds are Burning by Midnight Oil, in support of TckTckTck and climate justice. In the same year, Cotillard designed her own doll for UNICEF France campaign "Les Frimousses Font Leur Cinéma", that was sold to help vaccinate thousands of children in Darfur. In 2011, she publicly supported Chief Raoni in his fight against the Belo Monte Dam in Brazil and signed his petition.

In 2012, Cotillard was featured on Kate Winslet's book "The Golden Hat: Talking Back To Autism", with celebrity self-portraits to raise awareness and support for autism launched by Winslet's Golden Hat Foundation. In 2013, she caged herself near Paris's Louvre museum to demand the freeing of 30 Greenpeace activists jailed in Russia over an Arctic protest. She entered the cage and held a banner proclaiming "I am a climate defender".

In February 2014, she signed The Tiger Manifesto, a campaign calling for an end to everyday products being manufactured through forest destruction. Launched by Greenpeace, the campaign is encouraging consumers to demand products are forest and tiger-friendly, particularly in Indonesia, where the Sumatran tiger is on brink of extinction. In May 2014, Greenpeace released the animated video The Amazon's Silent Crisis, narrated by Cotillard. The video highlights the troubling illegal logging that threatens the Brazilian Amazon.

On 26 February 2015, she went to the Philippines along France's President François Hollande and actress Mélanie Laurent, to participate on a forum and encourage faster and more determined action on the global challenge of climate change. At the 2015 Cannes Film Festival, director Mark Osborne revealed that Cotillard used to visit Children's Hospitals and play The Rose (from the book The Little Prince) for the kids, years before she voiced the character in the 2015 film The Little Prince, directed by Osborne.

Cotillard was the ambassador of "1 Heart 1 Tree", an art project that fights climate change through its Plant for the Planet reforestation program. On 29 November 2015, The Eiffel Tower became a virtual forest with trees and words encouraging environmental activism projected onto it every evening. Cotillard and UN Secretary General Ban Ki-Moon, inaugurated the light installation on the eve of the official opening of the COP21 conference. She also donated her shoes to be displayed among an installation of over 10,000 shoes at the Place de la Republique in Paris. The installation replaced a giant march for climate change which was forbidden by French authorities following the deadly attacks in the capital on 13 November, which cost 130 lives. It was a way of showing the determination of protesters in their fight against climate change, and allowed them to still send a strong message on the eve of the U.N. climate conference (COP21).

On 10 December 2015, Cotillard voiced the French version of the short film Home, made by Conservation International (CI). The short film debuted at the United Nations Momentum for Change Awards ceremony at the climate negotiations (COP21) in Paris. It was the latest addition to CI's award-winning "Nature Is Speaking" short film series. "Home" was produced to remind negotiators and world leaders at the climate talks of our common duty – how to care for the Earth that cares for us all. "This Earth is our shared home, our only home. The time to safeguard its future – and with it our own future – is right now," said Cotillard.

Advertising campaigns and endorsements

In 2008, Cotillard was chosen as the face of Dior's bag "Lady Dior", and was featured in an online short film directed by John Cameron Mitchell about the fictional character created by John Galliano. She starred in a series of short films that were situated in different cities to promote the "Lady Dior" handbags: Lady Noire Affair (in Paris) directed by Olivier Dahan; Lady Blue Shanghai, directed by David Lynch; Lady Rouge (in New York City), directed by Jonas Akerlund; and Lady Grey London, directed by John Cameron Mitchell and starring Ian McKellen and Russell Tovey. This campaign has also resulted in a musical collaboration with Scottish rock band Franz Ferdinand, where Cotillard has provided the vocals for a composition performed by the group, entitled "The Eyes of Mars", for the "Lady Rouge" campaign.

In 2012, Cotillard starred in the web-series Lady Dior Web Documentary and wrote and performed the song "Lily's body" for one episode, she also designed her own handbag for Dior, the "360° bag". Cotillard also appeared on the cover of the first issue of Dior Magazine in September 2012. In 2014, she wrote and co-directed alongside Eliott Bliss, a music video for her song "Snapshot in LA", especially for Lady Dior's campaign "Enter The Game – Dior Cuise 2015". Cotillard's contract with Dior ended in 2017.

In May 2013, Cotillard became the first actress to walk the red carpet of the Cannes Film Festival wearing the initial models from the Chopard Green Carpet Collection. In 2015, she designed a bracelet for Chopard's Green Carpet Collection made of ethical Fairmined-certified gold.

In 2020, Cotillard designed her own sustainable jewelry collection for Chopard entitled "Ice Cube Capsule". She designed seven items curated from Fairmined-certified ethical gold and diamonds. The collection was unveiled on 29 September 2020 during Paris fashion week.

On 17 February 2020, Cotillard was announced as House ambassador and the new face of the Chanel No. 5 fragrance. Her first commercial for Chanel No. 5 was released on 29 October 2020. It was directed by Johan Renck and featured Cotillard dancing in the moon with French ballet dancer Jérémie Bélingard while singing a cover of Lorde's "Team".

Personal life
In the late 90s, Cotillard was in a relationship with French actor Julien Rassam. She had a long-term relationship with French actor Stéphan Guérin-Tillié from 2000 to 2005, with whom she co-starred in the short films Quelques jours de trop (2000) and Heureuse (2001), in the 2001 TV series Les redoutables, and in the 2005 feature films Cavalcade and Edy. She dated French singer Sinclair from 2005 to 2007.

Since October 2007, Cotillard has been in a relationship with French actor and director Guillaume Canet. They had been friends since 1997, and co-starred together for the first time years later in the 2003 film Love Me If You Dare. Despite common misconception, the couple are not married. Though since 2010 Cotillard has been spotted wearing a diamond solitaire on her left hand – a present from Canet – they are not engaged either. In 2014, Cotillard denied being married to Canet, instead referring to him as "my boyfriend" in interviews. In 2011, they had their first child, a son, Marcel, and in 2017, their second child, a daughter, Louise was born.

In January 2018, Cotillard said that with her then 6-year-old son entering school and a newborn daughter, she would be slowing down her filming schedule for the time being.

Public image

In the media

As of 2022, Cotillard has appeared on more than 300 magazine covers around the world, such as Vogue, Elle, Marie Claire, Variety, Harper's Bazaar, Vanity Fair, Madame Figaro, Glamour, W, Porter, The Hollywood Reporter and Wall Street Journal Magazine. She was the first actress on a Vogue Paris September cover in five years with her September 2010 cover, and was named "Woman of the Decade" by Vogue Paris on their list of the "40 Women of The Decade" in 2010. In August 2012, Cotillard was featured in three major magazine covers: the American Vogue, Vogue Paris and Marie Claire UK. She was also featured on the cover of the first issue of Dior Magazine in September 2012.

Cotillard was named "The Most Beautiful Face of 2013" by The Independent Critics List of the 100 Most Beautiful Famous Faces From Around the World, and ranked as one of the most "Beautiful Famous Faces" for 16 consecutive years. She was ranked No. 47 in 2017, No. 36 in 2016, No. 18 in 2015, No. 14 in 2014, No. 1 in 2013, No. 2 in 2012, No. 7 in 2011, No. 12 in 2010, No. 15 in 2009, No. 4 in 2008, No. 3 in 2007, No. 8 in 2006, No. 17 in 2005, No. 35 in 2004, No. 20 in 2003, and No. 31 in 2002.

In 2012, Cotillard was named "The World's Sexiest Woman" by the Hungarian magazine Periodika. In 2013, she was ranked No. 13 on Empire Online's list of the "100 Sexiest Movie Stars", was No. 12 on French magazine Slate's list of the "100 Most Influential Women of France", No. 68 on Total Films list of "Top 200 Performances of All Time" for her performance in La Vie en Rose, and named "Best Dressed Star of 2013" by the British Grazia magazine.

In 2014, she was described as "the great silent film actress of our time" by British film critic Robbie Collin from The Daily Telegraph, for her ability to show emotions only with her eyes and facial expressions, although she has never appeared in a silent film, and was named "The Most Bankable French Actress of the 21st Century", her films accumulating more than 37 million ticket sales in France from 2001 to 2014. She ranked No. 18 on British GQ magazine's list of "The World's 20 Coolest Women" in 2014, and was chosen as one of the 'Best Film Femme Fatales' by Harper's Bazaar in 2014, for her performance as Mal in Inception.

In April 2016, Vox.com analysed the actresses who have starred in the best reviewed films ranked by average Metacritic rating, and Cotillard was No. 3 with an average score of 68. Cotillard ranked second on Google's "Most Searched Actresses of 2016".

In 2017, she was featured on the official poster of the 42nd César Awards in a still from the 2013 film Blood Ties.

The ivory Jean Paul Gaultier gown Cotillard wore at the 80th Academy Awards on 24 February 2008 is regarded as one of the greatest Oscar dresses of all time.

In 2020, Vogue ranked Cotillard number fourteen of "The most beautiful French actresses of all time".

In mid-october 2021, a new book Le traître et le néant (English: The traitor and the nether) by two journalists from Le Monde, Gérard Davet and Fabrice Lhomme came out nation-wide in France. Few days later, countless French national newspapers and medias have reported that French President Emmanuel Macron had declared "She pisses me off, Cotillard" (French: Elle me fait chier, Cotillard) as claimed in this book. Jean-Marc Dumontet is cited as eye-witness. This statement was in response to Cotillard's 2018 criticisms of his policies especially environmental ones, when she stated in Le Parisien : "My faith in politics has been really undermined. He's making promises to have a good image and behind [our backs] does not keeping them at all. I find that unbearable."

In 2023, she was featured on the official poster of the 48th César Awards in a still from the 2021 film Annette, and also in an animated poster featuring Cotillard singing in the film.

In popular culture
Cotillard was mentioned in Trivia, an episode of The Office that aired in January, 2012. Her 2001 film Les Jolies Choses, was the final answer to a trivia contest. Unlikely contestant Kevin Malone (portrayed by Brian Baumgartner) answers correctly and wins the contest. He credits Cotillard's multiple nude scenes in the film for his quick recall.

Cotillard has had a look-alike puppet in the French television show Les Guignols de l'info since 2013.

In July 2014, a sample of Cotillard and Leonardo DiCaprio's dialogue in the train scene from Inception ("You're waiting for a train..."), was featured on the song "Far Away" by nExow at minute 03:28. Brazilian brand Chara Rial also named a Mocassin shoes after her in 2014. In April 2015, the French rap band Columbine released a song titled "Marion". During the chorus, they sing "Je t'aime, t'es belle comme Marion Cotillard" ("I love you, you're as pretty as Marion Cotillard", in French).

In the TV Land sitcom Hot in Cleveland (2014; season 5, episode 12: I Just Met the Man I'm Going to Marry), Wendie Malick's character is presenting the Oscars nominees for Best Actress in a Supporting Role in a mise-en-abîme scene and declares "Marion Cotill..., you know the French chick who gets nominated for everything."

On April 11, 2015 (Season 40, Episode 18), Cecily Strong debuted her now recurring Saturday Night Live impersonation of Cotillard as a respected and dedicated actress debating the place of women in the film industry for the Lincoln Center for the Performing Arts "Actress Round Table" and "Hollywood Game Night" sketches (other appearances as Cotillard include: Season 42, Episode 1, 8 and 20 as well as Season 43, Episode 3).

Filmography

As of 2020, Cotillard's films have grossed more than $3.6 billion at the worldwide box-office.

Feature films

Short films

Television

Voice work
Cotillard has dubbed several films and documentaries in France and in the U.S., and also dubbed in French all of her roles in English-language films.

Music videos

Theatre

Accolades

Among other awards, Cotillard has received an Academy Award for Best Actress, a Golden Globe Award, a BAFTA Award, two César Awards, a Lumières Award and a European Film Award. She has also won a New York Film Critics Circle Award, a National Society of Film Critics Award, and a Los Angeles Film Critics Association Award for Best Actress, the critics' awards trifecta. Cotillard and Isabelle Adjani are the only French actresses to win the New York Film Critics Circle Award for Best Actress. Adjani won in 1975 for The Story of Adele H. (1975), while Cotillard was awarded for her performances in The Immigrant (2013) and Two Days, One Night (2014) in 2014.

In March 2010, Cotillard was made a Chevalier (Knight) of the Ordre des Arts et des Lettres (Order of the Arts and Letters) by the French government for her "contribution to the enrichment of French culture". She was promoted to Officier (Officer) on 10 February 2016.

On 14 July 2016, Cotillard received France's highest honor – she was named a Chevalier (Knight) of the Légion d'Honneur (Legion of Honor). She was among 650 names from the worlds of politics, culture, sport and public life published in the government's official journal for Bastille Day.

See also
 List of actors with two or more Academy Award nominations in acting categories
 List of actors nominated for Academy Awards for non-English performances
 List of Academy Award winners and nominees for Best Foreign Language Film
 List of French Academy Award winners and nominees

References

External links

 
 
 
 
 
 

1975 births
Living people
French film actresses
French television actresses
French voice actresses
French stage actresses
Actresses from Paris
Best Actress Academy Award winners
Best Actress César Award winners
Best Actress Lumières Award winners
Best Musical or Comedy Actress Golden Globe (film) winners
Best Supporting Actress César Award winners
Best Actress BAFTA Award winners
Chevaliers of the Ordre des Arts et des Lettres
Chevaliers of the Légion d'honneur
European Film Award for Best Actress winners
French women singer-songwriters
French singer-songwriters
French songwriters
French activists
French women activists
French environmentalists
French women environmentalists
French people of Breton descent
French film producers
French women film producers
People associated with Greenpeace
20th-century French actresses
21st-century French actresses
Officiers of the Ordre des Arts et des Lettres
Audiobook narrators
Women bass guitarists
French keyboardists
French women guitarists
French bass guitarists
21st-century French singers
21st-century French women singers
21st-century bass guitarists
Czech Lion Awards winners
Chopard Trophy for Female Revelation winners